Two Blind Eyes (Persian: Do Cheshm-e Bi-soo) is a 1983 film by the Iranian director Mohsen Makhmalbaf. The film was written by Makhmalbaf and shot by Ebrahim Ghazizadeh. Set during the Iran-Iraq war, it is an early example of Sacred Defence cinema.

Cast
Mohammad Kasebi
Majid Majidi
Reza Cheraghi
Habib Valinezhad
Ghasem Kharrazani
Esmat Makhmalbaf
Fatemeh Meshkini
Hamid Derakhshan
Behzad Behzadpour
Hossein Sabri
Ebrahim Majidi

References

Iranian drama films
1983 films